Kirtinagar is a town and a Nagar Panchayat and a Taluk in Tehri Garhwal district in the Indian state of Uttarakhand.

Geography
Kirtinagar Taluk contains around 20 villages.

History
Kirtinagar was founded by Garhwal Raja Kirti Shah by the Alaknanda River in response to the destruction by flood of nearby Old Srinagar in 1894.

Demographics
As of the 2011 Census Kirtinagar has a population of 1,517, of which 41% are females and 10% are children up to 6 years of age. The average literacy rate is 81%, higher than the state average of 79%, with male literacy at 79%, and female literacy at 85%.
Over the ten years from 2001, the population has increased hugely, by 46% from 1040, and the proportions of females and children are both slightly down from their earlier 43% and 11% levels. Literacy is up from 76%.

References

Cities and towns in Tehri Garhwal district